Dianthus japonicus, known as seashore pink, is a species of herbaceous perennial plant in the genus Dianthus.

References

japonicus
Plants described in 1784